The election to the Berlin House of Representatives occurred on December 5, 1954, alongside elections to the twelve borough assemblies of Berlin. The SPD nominated Otto Suhr as their leading candidate the CDU nominated the incumbent mayor since October 1953, Walther Schreiber.

Although the opposition SPD lost 0.1 percentage points, it narrowly increased its presence in parliament and obtaining a majority of deputies. The CDU also increased its share of the vote by 5.7 percentage point, increasing there number of deputies by 10, these gains by the CDU were offset by a collapse in support for the FDP, which lost 10.2 percentage points and 13 deputies. The German party narrowly failed to cross the 5% electoral threshold winning 4.9% of the vote, around 2,500 votes shy of making it into the parliament. For the first time since the splitting of the city administration into east and west the SED competed in West Berlin, the party was unable to make any electoral impact however, winning just 2.7% of the vote.

While the SPD did win an outright majority, they agreed to enter into a coalition with the CDU because of the tense political situation in Berlin at the time. On January 11, 1955, Suhr was elected as West Berlin's new mayor.

|-style="background:#E9E9E9;"
! colspan="2" style="text-align:left;" |Parties
!Votes
!%
!+/-
!Seats
!+/-
|-
| width=5px style="background-color: " |
| style="text-align:left;" | Social Democratic Party of Germany
| 684,906
| 44.6%
| -0.1%
| 64
| +3
|-
| style="background-color: " |
| style="text-align:left;" | Christian Democratic Union
| 467,117	
| 30.4%
| +5.7%
| 44
| +10
|-
| style="background-color: " |
| style="text-align:left;" | Free Democratic Party
| 197,204
| 12.8%
| -10.3%
| 19
| -13
|-
| style="background-color: " |
| style="text-align:left;" | German Party
| 75,321
| 4.9%
| +1.2%
| 0
| 
|-
| style="background-color: " |
| style="text-align:left;" | Socialist Unity Party
| 41,375
| 2.7%
| +2.7%
| 0
| 
|-
| style="background-color: " |
| style="text-align:left;" | All German Bloc
| 39,236
| 2.5%
| +0.3%
| 0
| 
|-
| style="background-color: " |
| style="text-align:left;" | Other Parties
| 30,734
| 2.1%
| +0.3%
| 0
| 
|- style="background:#E9E9E9;"
! colspan="2" style="text-align:left;" |Total
! style="text-align:center;" | 1,555,511
! style="text-align:center;" colspan="2"| 100%
! style="text-align:center;" | 127
! style="text-align:center;" | -
|-
|colspan=7|Source
|}

State election, 1954
1954 elections in Germany